Shine a Light is the first live album by South Korean rapper and singer-songwriter G-Dragon. It was released on March 30, 2010 and is a two-disc compilation of live and remixed songs, recorded during his Shine a Light concert in December 2009 at Olympic Gymnastics Arena.

Background
Following G-Dragon's plagiarism accusations for his song "Heartbreaker" by Sony Music who saw similarities to Flo Rida's song "Right Round", YG Entertainment announced they had personally reached out to Flo Rida's representatives. The label confirmed on March 6, 2010 that Flo Rida is going to appear as a featuring artist in a new version of "Heartbreaker", to be included as a bonus track on G-Dragon's live album Shine a Light.

Track listing
All tracks written by G-Dragon; "The Leaders" co-written with Teddy and CL.

Disc 1

Disc 2

Charts and sales

Charts

Sales

Release history

References

External links
 Official Website

2010 live albums
G-Dragon albums
YG Entertainment albums
Korean-language albums
Albums produced by G-Dragon